William Francis Mitchell (born 7 March 1952) is a professor of economics at the University of Newcastle, New South Wales, Australia and Docent Professor of Global Political Economy at the University of Helsinki, Finland. He is one of the founding developers of Modern Monetary Theory.

Early life
Mitchell was born to working class parents in Glen Huntly, a suburb of Melbourne, Australia, in March 1952. The family moved to Ashwood, a new Housing Commission suburb soon after. He attended Ashwood Primary School (1957–1963) and Ashwood High School (1964–1969).

Education
Mitchell holds the following degrees: PhD in Economics, University of Newcastle, 1998; Bachelor of Commerce, Deakin University, 1977; and Master of Economics Monash University, 1982. He completed a Master's Preliminary at the University of Melbourne in 1978 (with first-class honours).

Career

Academic
Since 1990, Mitchell is a professor at University of Newcastle, New South Wales. He also holds the position of Docent Professor in Global Political Economy, Faculty of Social Sciences, University of Helsinki, Finland.

Activist
Mitchell works to promote active government economic policies and the use of fiscal deficits as a tool to enhance well-being and environmental sustainability. He is Director of the Centre of Full Employment and Equity (CofFEE), a non-profit, research organisation at the University of Newcastle. Its mission statement is to advance research and policies that can restore full employment and achieve a society that "delivers equitable outcomes for all".

Mitchell participates in public and community activities on the issues of politics, economics, fiscal sustainability, and the environment.

Mitchell opposes neo-liberal economic theories and practices; he disputes the "revisionism" of History ostensibly perpetrated by mainstream or conservative economists, especially in relation to the policies of the New Deal. He has often been called to appear as an expert witness in industrial matters in state and federal tribunals in Australia, as well as in various government enquiries. His work in childcare industrial cases in Victoria and New South Wales influenced the realignments in the relevant State and Federal Awards in that sector.

Author
Mitchell coined the term Modern Monetary Theory, also known as MMT. He coined the term in reference to John Maynard Keynes' claim that for at least 4,000 years money has been  "a creature of the state". He is a prominent promoter of MMT in macroeconomics.

He has written extensively in the fields of macroeconomics, econometrics and public policy. He has published widely in refereed academic journals and books and regularly gives conference presentations abroad.

Macroeconomics
His book Macroeconomics (Macmillan, March 2019), co-written with L. Randall Wray and Martin Watts, is a textbook that "encourages students to take a more critical approach to the prevalent assumptions around the subject of macroeconomics, by comparing and contrasting heterodox and orthodox approaches to theory and policy ... based on the principles of Modern Monetary Theory (MMT)".

Reclaiming the State: A Progressive Vision of Sovereignty for a Post-Neoliberal World
His 2017 book Reclaiming the State: A Progressive Vision of Sovereignty for a Post-Neoliberal World (September, 2017), co-written with Italian journalist Thomas Fazi, "reconceptualises the nation state as a vehicle for progressive change. They show how despite the ravages of neoliberalism, the state still contains resources for democratic control of a nation's economy and finances. The populist turn provides an opening to develop an ambitious but feasible left political strategy. It offers an urgent, provocative and prescient political analysis of our current predicament, and lays out a comprehensive strategy for revitalising progressive economics in the 21st century."

Eurozone Dystopia: Groupthink and Denial on a Grand Scale

His book Eurozone Dystopia: Groupthink and Denial on a Grand Scale (May 2015), provides "a critical history and analysis from the perspective of Modern Monetary Theory of the European economic crisis that started in 2009."

Full Employment Abandoned
Full Employment Abandoned: Shifting Sands and Policy Failures (2008), co-written with Joan Muysken of Maastricht University, traces the theoretical analysis of the nature and causes of unemployment over the last 150 years and argue that the shift from involuntary to so-called "natural rate" concepts of unemployment are behind an "ideological backlash" against state intervention as notably advocated, within the frame of the free economy, by Keynes in the 1930s. The authors further contend that unemployment is a reflection of systemic policy failures, rather than an "individual problem". They present a theoretical and empirical critique of the neo-liberal approach and suggest that the reinstatement of full employment, along with price stability, is a viable policy goal, achievable through an activist fiscal policy.

The notion of job guarantee is introduced, whereby the government would guarantee a job to every willing and able adult individual, paying a wage that would become society's minimum wage, and would be expression of the aspiration of the society of the lowest acceptable standard of living.

Musician
Mitchell has played guitar professionally in bands over the years. Mitchell currently plays with Pressure Drop, a Melbourne-based reggae-dub band, originally popular in the 1970s and early 1980s. The band reformed in 2010.

Mitchell often refers to the economics discipline, and especially the academia, in disparaging terms, stating, only half-jokingly, that his work as a musician does less damage to people. "I think my economics profession is very dangerous," he says.

Personal life
Mitchell is a "passionate" cyclist. He was an "active bike racer" when, in 1995, he founded the website Cyclingnews.com, which was sold in 1999 to the Australian media company Knapp Communications. It was subsequently bought in 2007 by Future plc.

See also

 Modern Monetary Theory
 Fiat money vs. commodity money
 Government accounting
 Balanced budget
 Legal Tender Cases
 Job Guarantee
 NAIBER

References

Additional sources
 Mitchell, William, Joan Muysken, Tom Van Veen: Growth and cohesion in the European Union: The Impact of Macroeconomic Policy (2006), Edward Elgar Publishing, 
 Mitchell, William & Joan Muysken: Full Employment Abandoned: Shifting Sands and Policy Failures (2008), Edward Elgar Publishing 320 pp, Hardback,

External links
 Bill Mitchell's personal website
 Bill Mitchell's blog, with "commentary on economic events"
 CofFEE website
 CyclingNews.com

1952 births
Living people
20th-century Australian economists
Modern monetary theory scholars
Post-Keynesian economists
Academic staff of the University of Newcastle (Australia)
Academics from Melbourne
People from the City of Monash
Monash University alumni
Deakin University alumni
University of Newcastle (Australia) alumni
21st-century Australian economists